Singles is a compilation album by the experimental rock band Red Krayola. It was released in 2004 by Drag City. 

The tracks "Wives In Orbit" and "Yik-Yak" included here are not the studio versions issued on the Radar 7" single but previously unreleased live recordings. The tracks "An Old Man's Dream" and "The Milkmaid" are the same recordings included in the album Kangaroo? Left off the collection are the three remixes of "Father Abraham" from the 12" single and the A-side mix of "Stil De Grain Brun" from the 7" single.

Critical reception
Paste wrote that "the best of it captures the cool detachment and rabid experimentalism that makes Thompson a truly unique case."

Track listing

References

External links 
 

2004 compilation albums
Drag City (record label) compilation albums
Red Krayola albums